Togethering is a 1985 jazz album by guitarist Kenny Burrell and saxophonist Grover Washington Jr., released on the relaunched Blue Note label.

Reception

The Allmusic review by Michael G. Nastos called it "a most satisfying session, with few -- if any -- commercial concessions" and noted "If any purist mainstream jazz listeners ever had problems with these musicians going for a buck by putting more R&B into their music, all is forgiven with the issuance of this marvelous album, which is more of a showcase for their true colors and collective musicianship beyond their commercialized efforts. Burrell and Washington proved to be a fine pairing -- a subtle, effective jazz partnership". A reviewer of Dusty Groove noted "Grover Washington Jr on Blue Note – but sounding really great here in the company of guitarist Kenny Burrell – very much back to the more basic reed work of his roots, and away from some of the smoother settings of his bigger dates from a few years before! Kenny's well-crafted guitar lines really direct the set – spinning out with energy and soul, and shaping the sound in tones that work especially well with Washington's soprano sax lines".

Track listing 
All compositions by Kenny Burrell except where noted
 "Soulero" (Richard Evans) – 4:36
 "Sails of Your Soul" (Grover Washington, Jr.) – 5:23
 "Day Dream" (Duke Ellington, Billy Strayhorn, John La Touche) – 5:01
 "A Beautiful Friendship" (Donald Kahn, Stanley Styne) – 5:04
 "Togethering" – 4:36
 "Romance Dance" – 3:28
 "Asphalt Canyon Blues" – 6:19
 "What Am I Here For?" (Ellington, Frankie Laine) – 4:46

Personnel 
Kenny Burrell – acoustic guitar, electric guitar
Grover Washington Jr. – soprano saxophone, tenor saxophone
Ron Carter – bass
Jack DeJohnette – drums
Ralph MacDonald – percussion (tracks 2 & 6)

References 

Kenny Burrell albums
Grover Washington Jr. albums
1985 albums
Blue Note Records albums